Golpashan was an Assyrian Christian town located on the western shore of Lake Urmia. The town was once one of the most prosperous towns in Urmia plains but was destroyed and abandoned in 1918. The site is now occupied by the village of Gol Pashin.

History
It is not known exactly when Assyrians first settled in Golpashan but they did found the village.  They have continuously inhabited the land since pre-recorded history.

This village played a dramatic part in the Assyrian genocide during and after World War I. It was attacked in February 1915 by bands of Turks . Another attack in 1918 destroyed the settlement completely.

Churches 
Golpashan has at least three main churches:
 Mar Sehyon (St. Zion) Assyrian Church of the East
 Mar Gewargis Assyrian Chaldean Catholic Church
 St. Mary Assyrian Evangelical Church

People from Golpashan 
 Eden Naby Assyrian historian.

See also

 Assyrians in Iran
 List of Assyrian settlements
 List of Assyrian villages

Notes

References
 .

Former populated places in West Azerbaijan Province
Assyrian settlements
Mass murder in 1915
Places of the Assyrian genocide